A fastener (US English) or fastening (UK English) is a hardware device that mechanically joins or affixes two or more objects together. In general, fasteners are used to create non-permanent joints; that is, joints that can be removed or dismantled without damaging the joining components. Welding is an example of creating permanent joints. Steel fasteners are usually made of stainless steel, carbon steel, or alloy steel.

Other alternative methods of joining materials include: crimping, welding, soldering, brazing, taping, gluing, cement, or the use of other adhesives. Force may also be used, such as with magnets, vacuum (like suction cups), or even friction (like sticky pads). Some types of woodworking joints make use of separate internal reinforcements, such as dowels or biscuits, which in a sense can be considered fasteners within the scope of the joint system, although on their own they are not general purpose fasteners.

Furniture supplied in flat-pack form often uses cam dowels locked by cam locks, also known as conformat fasteners. Fasteners can also be used to close a container such as a bag, a box, or an envelope; or they may involve keeping together the sides of an opening of flexible material, attaching a lid to a container, etc. There are also special-purpose closing devices, e.g. a bread clip.

Items like a rope, string, wire, cable, chain, or plastic wrap may be used to mechanically join objects; but are not generally categorized as fasteners because they have additional common uses. Likewise, hinges and springs may join objects together, but are ordinarily not considered fasteners because their primary purpose is to allow articulation rather than rigid affixment.

Industry
In 2005, it was estimated that the United States fastener industry runs 350 manufacturing plants and employs 40,000 workers. The industry is strongly tied to the production of automobiles, aircraft, appliances, agricultural machinery, commercial construction, and infrastructure. More than 200 billion fasteners are used per year in the U.S., 26 billion of these by the automotive industry. The largest distributor of fasteners in North America is the Fastenal Company.

Materials
There are three major steel fasteners used in industries: stainless steel, carbon steel, and alloy steel. The major grade used in stainless steel fasteners: 200 series, 300 series, and 400 series. Titanium, aluminium, and various alloys are also common materials of construction for metal fasteners. In many cases, special coatings or plating may be applied to metal fasteners to improve their performance characteristics by, for example, enhancing corrosion resistance. Common coatings/platings include zinc, chrome, and hot dip galvanizing.

Applications
When selecting a fastener for industrial applications, it is important to consider a variety of factors. The threading, the applied load on the fastener, the stiffness of the fastener, and the number of fasteners needed should all be taken into account. 

When choosing a fastener for a given application, it is important to know the specifics of that application to help select the proper material for the intended use. Factors that should be considered include:

Accessibility
Environment, including temperature, water exposure, and potentially corrosive elements
Installation process
Materials to be joined
Reusability
Weight restrictions

Types

A threaded fastener has internal or external screw threads.
The most common types are the screw, nut and bolt, possibly involving washers.
Other more specialized types of threaded fasteners include captive threaded fasteners, stud, threaded inserts, and threaded rods.

Other types of fastener include:

 anchor bolt
 batten
 bolt (fastener)
 screw
 bolt snap
 brass fastener
 buckle
 button
 cable tie
 cam
 captive fastener
 clamp (or cramp)
 hose clamp
 clasp and shackle
 bolt snap
 carabiner
 circle cotter
 lobster clasp
 cleco
 clip
 circlip
 hairpin clip
 paper clip
 terry clip
 clutch
 drawing pin (thumbtack)
 flange
 frog
 grommet
 hook-and-eye closure
hook and loop fastener
Velcro
 latch
 nail and rivet
 solid/round head rivets
 semi-tubular rivets
 blind (pop) rivet
 pegs
 clothespin
 tent peg
 PEM nut
 pins
 clevis fastener
 cotter
 dowel
 linchpin
 R-clip
 safety pin
 split pin
 spring pin
 tapered pin
 retaining rings
 circlip
 e-ring

 rivet-like
 well nut
 rock bolt
 rubber band (or bands of other materials)
 screw anchor
 snap fastener
 snap-fit
 staple
 stitches
 strap
 tie
 toggle bolt
 tolerance rings
 treasury tag
 twist tie
 wedge anchor
 zipper

Standards & traceability

ASME B18 standards on certain fasteners
The American Society of Mechanical Engineers (ASME) publishes several Standards on fasteners. Some are:

 B18.3 Socket Cap, Shoulder, Set Screws, and Hex Keys (Inch Series) 
 B18.6.1 Wood Screws (Inch Series)
 B18.6.2 Slotted Head Cap Screws, Square Head Set Screws, And Slotted Headless Set Screws (Inch Series)
 B18.6.3 Machine Screws, Tapping Screws, and Metallic Drive Screws (Inch Series)
 B18.18 Quality Assurance For Fasteners
 B18.24 Part Identifying Number (PIN) Code System Standard for B18 Fastener Products

For military hardware 
American screws, bolts, and nuts were historically not fully interchangeable with their British counterparts, and therefore would not fit British equipment properly. This, in part, helped lead to the development of numerous United States Military Standards and specifications for the manufacturing of essentially any piece of equipment that is used for military or defense purposes, including fasteners. World War II was a significant factor in this change.

A key component of most military standards is traceability. Put simply, hardware manufacturers must be able to trace their materials to their source, and provide traceability for their parts going into the supply chain, usually via bar codes or similar methods. This traceability is intended to help ensure that the right parts are used and that quality standards are met in each step of the manufacturing process; additionally, substandard parts can traced back to their source.

See also
 Safety wire
 Taiwan International Fastener Show

References

Further reading